Minjudang, literally the Democratic Party, may refer to:

North Korea 
 Korean Social Democratic Party

South Korea 
Korea Democratic Party, 1945–1949
Democratic Party (South Korea, 1955), 1955–1964
New Democratic Party (South Korea), 1963-1980
Reunification Democratic Party informally known as Democratic Party (1987)
Democratic Party (South Korea, 1990)
Democratic Party (South Korea, 1991)
Democratic Party (South Korea, 1995), 1995–1997, merged with Grand National Party
Democratic Party (South Korea, 2000), 2000–2007, "New Millennium Democratic Party" and "New Politics Congress"
Democratic Party (South Korea, 2007), 2007–2008, "Centrist Reformists Democratic Party"
Democratic Party (South Korea, 2008), 2008–2011, "United New Democratic Party" and "United Democratic Party"
Democratic Party (South Korea, 2011), 2011–2014, "Democratic United Party"
Minjoo Party (2014), 2014–2016, merged with Democratic Party of Korea
Democratic Party of Korea, "New Politics Alliance for Democracy", then "Together Democratic Party"

See also 
 Conservatism in South Korea
Democratic Nationalist Party (South Korea)
Democratic Republican Party (South Korea)
Democratic Justice Party
New Korea Party
 United Liberal Democrats
 Progressivism in South Korea
 Democratic Labor Party (South Korea)
 Liberalism in South Korea
 Jinbodang (disambiguation)
 Nodongdang (disambiguation)
 Democratic Party (disambiguation)